Moti Dungri is a Hindu temple complex dedicated to lord Ganesha in Jaipur, Rajasthan. It was built in 1761 under supervision of Seth Jai Ram Paliwal. The temple is a popular tourist attraction in the city and is located next to the Birla Temple

History 
The Moti Dungri temple is situated at bottom of the Moti Dungri hill and the fort of Moti Dungri in Jaipur, Rajasthan. The icon of the god Ganesha established in the temple is said to be more than five-hundred years old, and was brought here in 1761 by Seth Jai Ram Paliwal who was accompanying Maharaja Madho Singh I, from Udaipur. It was brought to Udaipur from Gujarat. The temple was built under Paliwal's supervision.

The trunk of the sindoor-coloured Ganesha icon is rightwards. Devotees offer laddo sweets, at least, 1.25 lakh devotees pay respect to Ganesha every year. A fair is organized every Wednesday in the temple complex.

There is a lingam (icon of the god Shiva) in the Moti Dungri Fort complex, which open to visitors once a year on Mahashivratri, the festival of Shiva. The Birla Mandir shrine dedicated to the deities Lakshmi Narayan is situated south of Ganesha temple.

Architecture 
The layout and structure of Moti Dungri is built in the Nagara style and is based on the model of Scottish castle. There are three entrance gates and few steps at the front. It was built using limestone and marble and construction work was completed in 4 months.

Transport
The temple is 6-km distant from Jaipur. Jaipur International Airport is the nearest airport and the Gandhi Nagar, nearest railway station.

References

External links 

Tourist attractions in Jaipur
Hindu temples in Jaipur